Tim Woolcock  (born 1952 in Lancashire, England) is a Modern British painter painting in the tradition of the 1950s. His works have been exhibited nationally and internationally and are in private and public collections worldwide. In 2009 the Office of Public Works in Dublin, Ireland acquired one of his artworks for the Department of Arts, Heritage and the Gaeltacht.

Life and career
Between 1963 and 1970, he attended Arnold School in Blackpool, northern England. In 1971, he attended Roehampton Institute (London University) to study Philosophy and Art. From 1974–1986, he taught in London schools. Currently he lives part of the year on a farm in County Carlow, Ireland where his studio is located. Tim Woolcock is a supporter of Blackpool FC.  In 2019 Tim Woolcock created and then donated the painting "Blue and Turquoise Amalgam" for the Chelsea and Westminster Hospital second floor atrium as he and members of his family have been patients in the hospital, and he wanted to return something in gratitude. As of 2022 Tim Woolcock is being represented by Simon Shore of the Stow Art House gallery.

Family and childhood
Tim Woolcock's grandfather was a tin miner at the Geevor mine near St. Just, Cornwall. He left for South Dakota, US when tin mining slumped. His father was born in South Dakota but lived his early life in St Just after his grandfather's return to his home country. Tim Woolcock spent many years as a young boy in St Just on a holiday and was astounded at the turquoise color of the sea which he noticed as being different from the seawater in Lancashire where he was born. He also finds the light in Cornwall great for painting and that many artists ended up in St Ives 11 miles from St Just, a very important artistic community especially in the 1950s. He heard of this as a teenager and began to explore this artistic movement and the lives of these artists. He was fortunate to one day take a long walk with Alan Davie on the rocks near St Just.

Style and influences

As a modern British painter Woolcock's landscapes have often been described as mystical in their composition. He has always shown an affinity with Zen and this is reflected in most of his work. The strong pigments used in his oil colour have also made his work distinctive.

The  Jenna Burlingham Fine Art gallery describes his style this way:

"Tim's painting clearly shows his inspiration from Modern British painters, particularly the traditions of the 1950s and St Ives Schools. As with landscape painters of the earlier twentieth century, such as Paul Nash and Evelyn Dunbar, Tim's landscapes have a somewhat mystical quality and at times approach abstraction. The simplicity and geometry found in work of the St Ives School - so important to the development of Modern British art - is a particular inspiration, with artists such as Patrick Heron, William Scott and Ben Nicholson being most key in his development, though Tim's paintings have a strength and clarity all their own. A knowledge of Zen and understanding of the natural world is reflected in his work,

'I have been greatly influenced by Zen writers, some who have said that the real aim of art is purposeless - not to be confused with a nihilistic approach - in 'Zen and The Art of Archery' it is said that in calligraphy strokes are made by the brush with perhaps the painter not fully being conscious of his or her efforts. I have found this to be true when painting, as if a certain effortless process is ignited where the self drops away and a painting manifests without a painter.'

His main subjects are landscapes and abstractions, taking his influences from the locale surrounding his studio in Ireland, where he takes his daily walks, and trips to the countryside of the UK. As with many painters who take landscape as their subject, Tim's works usually begins life as a series of sketches. However, it is the spirit of the place that determines his final outcome. It is the particular beauty of the British and Irish countryside that he seeks to convey in his landscape paintings."

The London Times art critic Joanna Pitman wrote this about Woolcock's style and influences: "The scale and proportions of his work present an internal harmony, and this mood is completed in the delicate balance between form and the exquisite colours he uses. We see lyrical lines and geometric fragmented shapes...Woolcock has seemed to show an interest in Cubism and a wonderful sense of contour and drama. There is a meditative serenity in his colour variations which perhaps reflects the contemplative personality of Woolcock himself...his landscapes evoke the beauty and grandeur of the Irish Countryside"

At the Paisnel Gallery Exhibition "Nine by Three" in 2016 Tim Woolcock stated "The execution of a painting can be startling spontaneous once I've comprehended the essence of a subject. Some of my paintings may instill different feelings in two separate viewers. Over the years I have asked collectors what motivated them to purchase my paintings and the majority replied 'the primary visual impact was the deciding factor'. I have never really attempted to manipulate my material to communicate something to an audience. I would always hope that paintings produced would evoke a spirit. If the 'self' can be forgotten in front of an easel who knows what may manifest?"

Exhibitions
2002 St Gilles Gallery, Norwich;
2003 Bloxham Gallery, London;
2004 Russell Gallery, London; Art London; Art Chicago;
2005 Royal Society of British Artists; Russell Gallery, London; Art London; Langham Gallery, Suffolk;
2006 Lemon Street Gallery, Cornwall;
2009 13th Boston Fine Art Show;
2012 Jorgensen Gallery Dublin;
2016 Paisnel Gallery, London;
2017 Paisnel Gallery, London;
2016 London Art Fair, Paisnel Gallery, London;
2018 London Art Fair, Paisnel Gallery, London;
2018 St Ives & Post War, The Nine British Art, London;
2018 British Art Fair, London;
2018 20/21 British Art Fair, The Nine British Art, London;
2019 London Art Fair, The Nine British Art, London;
2021 The Nine British Art. London Art Fair 2021
2022 The Abstract Line. The Stow Art House

Notes

References
Tim Woolcock: Modern British Artist, Author: John Bloxham 
Tim Woolcock Exhibition Catalogue 
Jorgensen Fine Art Exhibition Listing 
Boston 13th Fine Art Show 
Joanna Pitman, The Times (London) about Tim Woolcock 
Online Interview at MyHermosa.com 
Art Critic and Editor Carol Cordrey about Tim Woolcock 
Paisnel Art Gallery 
London Art Fair via Paisnel Art Gallery

External links
Tim Woolcock artist website
Tim Woolcock on ArtNet
13. Boston Fine Art Show 
Online Interview at MyHermosa.com
Tim Woolcock at the Jorgensen Gallery
Tim Woolcock Instagram Online Gallery

1952 births
Living people
People from Blackpool
20th-century British painters
British male painters
21st-century British painters
Alumni of the University of Roehampton
Artists from Lancashire
20th-century British male artists
21st-century British male artists